Cyclophora albidiscata is a moth in the  family Geometridae. It is found in Costa Rica and Peru.

References

Moths described in 1897
Cyclophora (moth)
Moths of Central America
Moths of South America